Dichogama is a genus of moths of the family Crambidae.

Species
Dichogama amabilis 
Dichogama colotha 
Dichogama decoralis (Walker, [1866])
Dichogama diffusalis Hampson, 1918
Dichogama fernaldi 
Dichogama gudmanni 
Dichogama innocua (Fabricius, 1793)
Dichogama jessicales Schaus, 1940
Dichogama obsolescens Hampson, 1912
Dichogama prognealis (Druce, 1895)
Dichogama redtenbacheri Lederer, 1863

References

Dichogamini
Crambidae genera
Taxa named by Julius Lederer